The Congregational Methodist Church is a Methodist denomination located primarily in the southern United States and northeastern Mexico. It is aligned with the Holiness movement and adheres to Wesleyan-Arminian theology. As of 1995, the denomination reported 14,738 in 187 churches.

Background

The Congregational Methodist Church was founded in Georgia in 1852 when several churches split from the Methodist Episcopal Church, South out of a desire to blend Methodist doctrine with congregational polity.

The Congregational Methodist Church is Wesleyan-Arminian in doctrine, congregational in its system of worship, republican or representative in its system of government, connexional in nature, missionary in outlook, evangelistic in endeavor, and cooperative in spirit. Each local church calls its pastor, owns its property, and sets its budget.

Its congregations are located in Georgia, Florida, Alabama, Mississippi. Louisiana, Texas, Tennessee, Missouri, Arkansas, Oklahoma, and New Mexico, plus the Mexican states of Coahuila and Tamaulipas and the Canadian province of Québec. It also has missionaries in the United States, Mexico, Belize, Haiti, Bolivia and Japan.

In 1944, the Congregational Methodist Church, then headquartered in Dallas, Texas, established The Dallas Bible School, an institution of higher education. The school was moved to Tehuacana, Texas, for several years, and was renamed Westminster College and Bible Institute. The school was permanently relocated to Florence, Mississippi in 1972, and was renamed Wesley College, a name that more reflected its Wesleyan-Arminian tradition. Wesley College was closed in July 2010.

The church's Denominational Headquarters is located in Florence, Mississippi, serving churches and programs of the denomination.

References

External links
 Congregational Methodist Church
 

Religious organizations established in 1852
Holiness denominations
Methodist denominations in North America
Methodist denominations established in the 19th century
Holiness organizations established in the 19th century
1852 establishments in Georgia (U.S. state)
Evangelical denominations in North America